The Wolf may refer to:

Film and television
 The Wolf (1914 film), an American film directed by Barry O'Neil
 The Wolf (1916 film), a Hungarian film directed by Michael Curtiz
 The Wolf (1949 film), a French drama film directed by Guillaume Radot
 The Wolf (2004 film), a film directed by Miguel Courtois
 Winston Wolf, a fictional character played by Harvey Keitel in the 1994 film Pulp Fiction
The Wolf (TV series), a 2019 Chinese TV series

Music
 The Wolf (Andrew W.K. album)
 The Wolf (Shooter Jennings album)
 "The Wolf" (Mumford & Sons song)
 "The Wolf", a song by The Banner from Frailty
 "The Wolf", a song by Motörhead from Rock 'n' Roll
 "The Wolf", a song by Fever Ray
 "The Wolf", a song by Eddie Vedder from Into the Wild
 "The Wolf", a song by Phildel from The Disappearance of the Girl

Books and magazines 
 The Wolf (magazine), an independent literary magazine based in the UK
 The Wolf (picture book), a 1991 picture book by Margaret Barbalet and Jane Tanner

Radio stations

Canada
 CKWF-FM (The Wolf), a Canadian radio station in Peterborough, Ontario
 CFWF-FM (The Wolf), a Canadian radio station in Regina, Saskatchewan

United States
 KFFF (FM) (99.3 The Wolf), an American radio station in Bennington, Nebraska, serving the Omaha market
 WDAF-FM (106.5 The Wolf), an American radio station in Kansas City, Missouri
 WBQQ (99.3 The Wolf), an American radio station in Kennebunk, Maine, simulcast of WTHT
 WTHT (99.9 The Wolf), an American radio station in Auburn, Maine
 WXLF (95.3 and 107.1 The Wolf), an American radio station in Hartford, Vermont
 WZLF (95.3 and 107.1 The Wolf), an American radio station in Bellows Falls, Vermont, simulcast of WXLF
 WLKK (107.7 and 104.7 The Wolf),an American Radio Station licensed to Wethersfield,New York

United Kingdom
 107.7 The Wolf, a British radio station in Wolverhampton, England

New Zealand
 The Wolf (radio network), a defunct nationwide radio network in New Zealand

See also
 Wolf (disambiguation)